AHP or Ahp may refer to:

Ahp
Krasue, known as Ahp in Cambodia, a nocturnal female spirit of Southeast Asian folklore

AHP as an abbreviation

Highway patrols
Alabama Highway Patrol
Arizona Highway Patrol
Arkansas Highway Patrol

Other uses
Above Head of Passes, the Head of Passes being the datum from which mileages on the Lower Mississippi River are measured
Adiabatic Half-Passage, an Adiabatic MRI Pulse design
African humid period, a period during the Holocene when Africa was much wetter than today
Afterhyperpolarization, in neurology
UCSF Alliance Health Project
Alpha Eta Rho, a professional college aviation fraternity
American Home Products, now Wyeth, an American company
American Homeowner Preservation an online real estate crowdfunding platform 
Analytic Hierarchy Process, a mathematical decision-making technique
Associated Hygienic Products LLC, part of DSG International Ltd.
Association health plan, in health insurance in the United States
Allied health professionals in the NHS

AHP as a code
Port Alexander Seaplane Base, Alaska, U.S., FAA LID: AHP
Apro language, ISO 639-3 language code ahp

See also